Waqash is a village in Bani Matar District of Sanaa Governorate, Yemen. It is at the southern end of the historical territory of the Bani Matar tribe.

History 
The first historical mention of Waqash is in 1202 (598 AH). It is described in the Ghayat al-amani of Yahya ibn al-Husayn as a center of the Mutarrifiyyah sect. indian man how writeen history

References 

Villages in Sanaa Governorate